The Fantasque was a Lion-class 64-gun ship of the line of the French Navy. She is famous for being captained by the French commander Pierre-André de Suffren during the American Revolutionary War.

Career 
Fantasque was launched in May 1758 at Toulon. She was commissioned under Captain de Catillon in May 1759.

Fantasque was a member of Admiral Jean-François de La Clue-Sabrans fleet as it sailed from Toulon on 5 August 1759. Admiral La Clue and his captains were given orders only to be opened having passed through the Strait of Gibraltar. Once through the Strait, Admiral Edward Boscawen, ordered the British Mediterranean Fleet to sail in pursuit. Fantasque was the lead ship of the weaker column of La Clues fleet and her captain chose to lead the column to the safety of the port at Cadiz, avoiding the closing British and the subsequent engagement, the Battle of Lagos.

In 1760 and 1761, she cruised in the Eastern Mediterranean in a squadron under Rochemore. The next year, she sailed with a squadron under Bompart.

In 1778, Fantasque was part of the squadron under Admiral d'Estaing supporting the rebels in the War of American Independence, under Captain Suffren. Suffren was leading a division, with his flag onFantasque, which he personally captained, along with the frigates Aimable, Chimère and Engageante.  The mission of his force was to support Franco-American efforts in the Battle of Rhode Island by striking a 5-frigate British squadron anchored in Narragansett Bay, off Newport, comprising HMS Juno, Flora, Lark, Orpheus and Cerebus. On 5 August 1778, Suffren entered the Bay and anchored next to the British, who cut their cables and scuttled their ships by fire to avoid capture. The Royal Navy ended up having to destroy ten of their own vessels in all, including five frigates.

The French fleet sailed to Martinique, where Suffren's division joined up with it, and from there to Grenada, leading to the Battle of Grenada on 6 July 1779. Fantasque was at the front of the vanguard, under Suffren, preceding the 74-gun Zélé. When the two fleets came in contact, she came under fire from the 74-gun Royal Oak and the 70-gun Boyne, sustaining 62 men killed or wounded.

In  September 1779, Saint-Antonin was given command of Fantasque. He captained her at the Siege of Savannah.

Fantasque was converted into a hospital ship in May 1780 for the movement of Rochambeau's troops from Brest to America, and was then converted into a transport. Now under Captain de Vaudoré, she was part of Des Touches's squadron engaged in action off the Chesapeake on 16 March 1781. She lasted in service until early 1784, when she was condemned at Lorient, but was then sent to Martinique where she became a hulk in November 1784

Sources and references 
 Notes

References

 Bibliography
 
 
 
 

 

 
 , CC-BY-NC-ND 4.0

Ships of the line of the French Navy